The 1969 Northeast Louisiana Indians football team was an American football team that represented Northeast Louisiana University (now known as the University of Louisiana at Monroe) in the Gulf States Conference during the 1969 NCAA College Division football season. In their sixth year under head coach Dixie B. White, the team compiled a 1–9 record.

Schedule

References

Northeast Louisiana
Louisiana–Monroe Warhawks football seasons
Northeast Louisiana Indians football